Disney's Dinosaur is a 2000 video game published by Ubi Soft, and functions as a tie-in to the Disney film of the same name.

Story
The game loosely follows the story of the film, starting with Aladar, Zini, Suri, and Plio on the Lemur Island. The island is destroyed in a meteor shower, forcing Aladar and his friends to flee to the mainland, where they encounter a herd of dinosaurs led by the ruthless Kron.

Gameplay
All versions of the game are played from a third-person top-down perspective. The game is played in a platforming-esque fashion, while most of the game consists of puzzles. The player's goal on each level is to complete tasks, such as defeating all enemy dinosaurs in an area, or locating and leading lost dinosaurs back to a herd. Enemies include Velociraptor, Oviraptor, Albertosaurus, Dryptosaurus, Spinosaurus and Carnotaurus.

The PlayStation and Dreamcast versions of the game both feature 12 levels. Checkpoints are featured in most levels. The PC and console versions allow the player to separately or simultaneously control three characters: Aladar, Zini, and the Pteranodon that took Aladar's egg to the lemur island in the film, here dubbed Flia. The PC and console versions feature clips from the film, which play before and after each level.

The Game Boy Color version supports use of the Game Boy Printer and features 27 levels, as well as six playable characters from the film: Aladar, Eema, Url, Zini, Plio and Suri.

Reception

The game was met with very mixed to negative reviews upon release. GameRankings and Metacritic gave it a score of 51.62% for the Game Boy Color version; 51.89% and 44 out of 100 for the PlayStation version; 49.20% and 53 out of 100 for the Dreamcast version; and 45.75% for the PlayStation 2 version.

Blake Fischer reviewed the Dreamcast version of the game for Next Generation, considering it adequate, but not as compelling.

Adam Cleveland of IGN reviewed the PlayStation version and said: "The game isn't exciting, the levels are drab, and the graphics are outdated. Dinosaur's objectives can be accomplished quickly, and the levels speed by. Before you know it, it's all over". Anthony Chau of IGN criticized the Dreamcast version for "horrible collision detection, tedious fighting sequences, and an overall gameplay experience that just isn't fun".

Marc Nix of IGN criticized the Game Boy Color version for lack of good puzzles and gameplay as droned and boring. Nix also criticized the game for bad collision detection and controls, as well as three of its playable lemur characters: "You end up playing most of the game with a leaping monkey. That may be fun elsewhere, but I want to stomp, to swim, to fight. [...] If the game box says 'Dinosaur', I want Dinosaurs. [...] Even Aladar, the film's star, sees little screen time in this game". Gamecenter's Colin Williamson considered it a "tired action/puzzler" game, although he praised the graphics.

References

External links
 
 
 

2000 video games
Ubisoft games
Adventure games
Dreamcast games
Game Boy Color games
PlayStation (console) games
PlayStation 2 games
Windows games
Dinosaurs in video games
Video games developed in Canada
Video games developed in France
Video games developed in the United States
Single-player video games
Video games set in prehistory
Disney video games
3D platform games
Digital Eclipse games